Drenov Do is a village in the municipalities of Jezero, Republika Srpska and Jajce, Bosnia and Herzegovina.

Demographics 
According to the 2013 census, its population was 28, all Serbs with 3 of them living in the Jezero part and the rest in Jajce.

References

Populated places in Jezero, Bosnia and Herzegovina
Populated places in Jajce
Villages in Republika Srpska